Hedgehog is a Chinese indie rock trio formed in 2005 by partners ZO (Zhao Zijian) and Atom (Shi Lu).  The band has a strong reputation throughout the country, renowned for their energetic live performances and catchy song writing.

Entertainment event and venue listing magazine City Weekend listed Hedgehog in their articles The Beijing Bands You Should Already Know About  and The Hottest Bands of 2011.

Their musical influences include The Jesus and Mary Chain, The Ramones and Nirvana.

The drummer Atom has been a focal point in the band, known for her small, cute appearance and aggressive drumming style.  Atom's name references Astroboy, who is known for his small size and power.

Hedgehog song lyrics are sung in both Mandarin Chinese and English, primarily by ZO. Atom also occasionally sings lead vocals.

In 2011, the band toured the US, with Xiu Xiu where they also recorded [Sun Fun Gun] in New York City, as produced by John Grew and Russell Simins from Jon Spencer Blues Explosion.

B-Side Lovers
Started in 2009, B-Side Lovers was ZO and Atom's two-piece side project whose edgier sound focused more on the songwriting process and instrumental experimentation.

Notable performances 
 October 21, 2010: CMJ Festival, New York

Discography 
 2006: Happy Idle Kid
 2007: Noise Hit World
 2009: Blue Day Dreaming
 2011: Honeyed and Killed
 2011: DEstroy meMOries
 2011: Still Alive (bootleg)
 2012: Sun Fun Gun
 2014: Phantom Pop Star
 2015: Neurons
 2018: Sound of life towards
 2020: A Newborn White Immortal

References

External links 
 
 Hedgehog on Douban
 Artist Page on Modern Sky
 Rock in China Entry

Chinese rock music groups
Musical groups from Beijing
Chinese indie rock groups